Stephanie Blicavs (née Cumming; born 26 July 1990) is an Australian professional basketball player.

Career

WNBL
Raised in Dandenong and playing for Rangers junior team, Blicavs joined the WNBL squad in 2006. She then gained a scholarship Australian Institute of Sport and joined the WNBL team. She then returned home to play for the Rangers and won a championship in 2012. She then travelled north to play for the Townsville Fire. She once again won the championship title in the 2015 final. For 2015–16 she returned home where she would Captain the Rangers season.

In 2020, Blicavs signed on for her first season since pregnancy, returning to Melbourne for her first season with the rebranded Southside Flyers.

SEABL
During the WNBL off-season, Blicavs has regularly played in the South East Australian Basketball League. From 2010–2012 she played for the Dandenong Rangers SEABL team as well as the WNBL side. In 2013, she joined the Frankston Blues. In 2014, she took her talents to the Ballarat Rush. In 2015, Blicavs played for the Kilsyth Cobras and led them to the Grand Final where she would go down to her hometown team, Dandenong. Despite losing the final, Blicavs took home the 2015 SEABL MVP award.

Personal life
In March 2017, Blicavs married the brother of her team mate Sara Blicavs, fellow basketballer, Kris. On 4 October 2019, Blicavs gave birth to her first child, Arlo.

References

1990 births
Living people
Guards (basketball)
Australian women's basketball players
Dandenong Rangers players
Townsville Fire players
Universiade medalists in basketball
Basketball players at the 2018 Commonwealth Games
Commonwealth Games medallists in basketball
Commonwealth Games gold medallists for Australia
Universiade bronze medalists for Australia
Medalists at the 2013 Summer Universiade
People from Dandenong, Victoria
Australian Institute of Sport basketball (WNBL) players
Basketball players from Melbourne
Sportswomen from Victoria (Australia)
Medallists at the 2018 Commonwealth Games